Billie Godfrey is an English singer.

Background
She started her career as a radio DJ, playing the kind of music she would later go on to record.

Godfrey writes much of her own material. Her stated influences include Stevie Wonder, Toni Braxton and Aretha Franklin.

She is the first female vocalist from the UK to record an entire album in Japanese on Number One (2001) (JVC/Victor Entertainment Inc).

From the mid-1990s until 2017 Godfrey was one of Heaven 17's resident female vocalists, both in the studio and on tour. She is featured on Heaven 17's studio album Naked as Advertised. On 21 November 2008, she made her first TV appearance with the group, on ITV's Now That’s What I Call 1983 show. She later completed the 2008 'Steel City Tour' where Heaven 17 supported The Human League. Godfrey also frequently supports Beverley Knight as a backing vocalist.

Billie Mitchell nee Godfrey was also a lecturer and vocal tutor at the Brighton Institute of Modern Music She now runs a luxury guest house in France with her husband, musician Ben Mitchell.

Advertising
Billie Godfrey appeared in broadband company Plusnet's national TV advertising campaign in 2010 as part of Heaven 17.

Discography

Albums
Ready For Love - Pulse-8 Records - 1994	
Number One (CD) - VICP-61461 - 2001
The Eden Tree - 2009

Singles and EPs
"This Beat"   6 versions	Pulse-8 Records		1994		
"I Love What You Do For Me" (12")	Cancan	CANIT011	1995		
Boomshanka And Billie Godfrey - "So Hard To Find" (12")	Cancan	CANIT 010	1995		
D-Ren 1 Feat. Billie Godfrey - "Inside" (12")	Ugly Music	UGM 006	1996		
Project 2000 Featuring Billie Godfrey - "It's About Time"   5 versions	Polydor		2000
SuReal - "You Take My Breath Away" 2000		
Lazy Grace Feat. Billie Godfrey - "How Deep Is Your Love" (12")	Hed Kandi	HEDK12001	2003		
Mitchell & Dewbury Featuring Billie Godfrey - "Beyond The Rains"   2 versions	Mumo Records		2003

References

External links

 Godfrey's official Myspace site
 BBC News article

Living people
Heaven 17 members
English women pop singers
1978 births